RDF Schema (Resource Description Framework Schema, variously abbreviated as RDFS, RDF-S, or RDF/S) is a set of classes with certain properties using the RDF extensible knowledge representation data model, providing basic elements for the description of ontologies. It uses various forms of RDF vocabularies, intended to structure RDF resources. RDF and RDFS can be saved in a triplestore, then one can extract some knowledge from them using a query language, like SPARQL.

The first version was published by the World-Wide Web Consortium (W3C) in April 1998, and the final W3C recommendation was released in February 2014. Many RDFS components are included in the more expressive Web Ontology Language (OWL).

Terminology 
RDFS constructs are the RDFS classes, associated properties and utility properties built on the vocabulary of RDF.

Classes 

 Represents the class of everything. All things described by RDF are resources.

 An rdfs:Class declares a resource as a class for other resources.
ex:John       rdf:type        foaf:Person
rdfs:Class    rdf:type        rdfs:Class

The other classes described by the RDF and RDFS specifications are:

 literal values such as strings and integers. Property values such as textual strings are examples of RDF literals. Literals may be plain or typed.

' the class of properties.

 Properties 
Properties are instances of the class  and describe a relation between subject resources and object resources. When used as such a property is a predicate (see also RDF: reification).

 the rdfsdomain of an  declares the class of the subject in a triple whose predicate is that property.

 the rdfs:range of an  declares the class or datatype of the object in a triple whose predicate is that property.

For example, the following declarations are used to express that the property  relates a subject, which is of type , to an object, which is of type :
ex:employer	  rdfs:domain  	  foaf:Person
ex:employer	  rdfs:range	  foaf:Organization
Given the previous two declarations, from the triple:
ex:John		  ex:employer	  ex:CompanyX

 a property used to state that a resource is an instance of a class.  A commonly accepted QName for this property is "a".

 allows declaration of hierarchies of classes.

For example, the following declares that 'Every Person is an Agent':
foaf:Person	  rdfs:subClassOf	  foaf:Agent
Hierarchies of classes support inheritance of a property domain and range (see definitions in the next section) from a class to its subclasses.

 an instance of  that is used to state that all resources related by one property are also related by another.

 an instance of  that may be used to provide a human-readable version of a resource's name.

 an instance of  that may be used to provide a human-readable description of a resource.

 Utility properties 

 an instance of  that is used to indicate a resource that might provide additional information about the subject resource.

 an instance of  that is used to indicate a resource defining the subject resource. This property may be used to indicate an RDF vocabulary in which a resource is described.

 RDFS entailment 
An entailment regime defines, by using RDFS (or OWL, etc.), not only which entailment relation is used, but also which queries and graphs are well-formed for the regime. The RDFS entailment is a standard entailment relation in the semantic web.

For example, the following declares that 'Dog1 is an animal', 'Cat1 is a cat', 'zoos host animals' and 'Zoo1 hosts the Cat2':
ex:dog1		rdf:type		ex:animal
ex:cat1		rdf:type		ex:cat
zoo:host	rdfs:range		ex:animal
ex:zoo1		zoo:host		ex:cat2

The graph is not well-formed because the system can not guess that a cat is an animal. To make a well-formed graph, the statement 'Cats are animals' can be added:
ex:cat		rdfs:subClassOf		ex:animal

Here is a correct example:

If the triplestore (or RDF database) implements the regime entailment of RDF and RDFS, the SPARQL query as follows (the keyword "a" is equivalent to rdf:type in SPARQL):
PREFIX  ex: <http://example.org/>
SELECT ?animal
WHERE
  { ?animal a ex:animal . }

The following gives the result with cat1'' in it, because the Cat's type inherits of Animal's type:

Examples of RDF vocabularies
RDF vocabularies represented in RDFS include:
 FOAF: the source of the FOAF Vocabulary Specification is RDFS written in the RDFa syntax.
 Dublin Core: RDFS source is available in several syntaxes
 Schema.org: the source of their schema was originally RDFS written in the RDFa syntax until July 2020.
 Simple Knowledge Organization System (SKOS) developed the RDF schema titled as SKOS XL Vocabulary, which is an OWL ontology for the SKOS vocabulary that uses the OWL RDF/XML syntax, and hence makes use of a number of classes and properties from RDFS.
 The Library of Congress defines an RDF schema titled Metadata Authority Description Schema in RDF, or MADS/RDF for short. From the abstract, it is intended to use for within their library and "information science (LIS) community". It allows for annotating special relational data, such as if an individual within a family is well-known via .
 The UniProt database has an RDF schema for describing biochemical data, and is specialized towards describing proteins.

See also 
 SPARQL Query Language for RDF
 Platform for Internet Content Selection (PICS)
 Resource Description Framework (RDF)
 Web Ontology Language (OWL)
 Semantic technology
 SHACL Shapes and Constraints Language for RDF

References

External links 
 W3C RDFS Specification
 W3C RDF 1.1 Primer
 W3C SPARQL 1.1 Entailment Regimes Specification
 W3C RDFS Entailment
 SPARQL2XQuery Map OWL-RDF/S ontologies and XML Schemas. Transform XML Schema to OWL.

Resource Description Framework
Knowledge representation languages
Semantic Web
World Wide Web Consortium standards